The 1998 Atlanta 500 Classic was the ninth round of the 1998 Indy Racing League season. The race was held on August 29, 1998 at the  Atlanta Motor Speedway in Hampton, Georgia. Sophomore Kenny Bräck took his third consecutive win after surging into the lead during the final sections of the 208-lap race ahead of Davey Hamilton, whose second place would be his best result of the season. Both Bräck and Hamilton jumped ahead of Scott Sharp in the points standings into first and second place, respectively, after Sharp suffered a gearbox malfunction and finished 18th. Polesitter Billy Boat, despite setting the fastest lap of the race, was taken out in a crash involving Marco Greco and Steve Knapp on Lap 167.

Report

Qualifying

Two laps qualifying. The worst lap from some of the drivers are unknown.

  Didn't qualify, but were allowed to start the race at the back of the field.

Failed to qualify or withdrew
 Stevie Reeves R for Pagan Racing - the team withdrew the entry on Thursday, before the start of practice sessions.

Race

Race Statistics
Lead changes: 12 among 6 drivers

Standings after the race
Drivers' Championship standings

 Note: Only the top five positions are included for the standings.

References

1998 in IndyCar